Josh Byrnes (born June 23, 1970) is an American baseball executive who is senior vice president of baseball operations for the Los Angeles Dodgers of Major League Baseball (MLB).

Byrnes began his career in 1994 as an intern with the Cleveland Indians. He rose to scouting director in 1998 and then joined the Colorado Rockies as assistant general manager after the 1999 season. He moved to the Boston Red Sox as assistant general manager in 2003 and was with the team in 2004 when they won their first World Series title since 1918. Byrnes was executive vice president and general manager of the Arizona Diamondbacks (2005-2010) and the San Diego Padres (2011-2014). He joined the Dodgers in 2014 and since that time the team has won National League pennants in 2017, 2018 and 2020; and the World Series in 2020.

Early life
Byrnes grew up in Washington, D.C., where he attended and played second base for St. Albans School, breaking the single season hits record. He was recruited by Haverford College, where he was team captain and set records for home runs and RBI.
He graduated in 1992 with a BA in English.

Cleveland Indians
Byrnes joined the Cleveland Indians in 1994 after meeting with Ronald M. Shapiro, the father of Mark Shapiro, who would become the team's general manager, at a Haverford College Alumni game. He quickly worked his way up the organizational ladder, first as an intern, then as advance scout, and then to scouting director in 1998. The Cleveland Indians won the American League Championship Series and advanced to the World Series in 1995 and 1997; and won Central Division titles in 1995, 1996, 1997, 1998 and 1999.

Colorado Rockies
In 1999, Byrnes was hired by the general manager at the time, Dan O'Dowd, to fill the assistant general manager position for the Colorado Rockies, where he was in charge of the farm and scouting departments.

Boston Red Sox
Byrnes joined the Boston Red Sox as assistant general manager in 2003 when he was recruited by the team's general manager, Theo Epstein. In his second season with the Boston Red Sox, the team won the 2004 World Series. It was the Red Sox' first World Series championship since 1918, ending what remains the third longest championship drought in the history of any Major League team, after the Chicago White Sox (1917–2005) and the Chicago Cubs (1908–2016).

In a 2005 interview with The Boston Globe, Epstein said of Byrnes, "He's a key voice in player personnel. He's got as much a feel for evaluating and statistical analysis as anyone in baseball.”

Arizona Diamondbacks
Byrnes joined the Arizona Diamondbacks as general manager in 2006, where he remained until July 1, 2010. 
In the two seasons preceding his arrival, the Diamondbacks had the worst run differential in the National League. Charged with reducing payroll and adding youth to the roster, Byrnes pushed the team forward towards contention. The 2007 team won the NL West division and advanced to the NLCS, as one of eight lower-third payroll teams to accomplish that feat since 2006. The 2008 team held first place in their division until September.

Byrnes appointed A. J. Hinch as manager during the 2009 season, which would largely define his tenure with the team. The move was considered unorthodox because of Hinch's prior front office position in player development.
According to a 2016 story by Ken Rosenthal of Fox Sports, Byrnes “actually was ahead of his time.” Rosenthal noted, “I was one of many in the media who was critical of the move and Byrnes’ framing of it. But the rationales that made Hinch's hiring so controversial are now almost standard, barely drawing notice today.” 

After Byrnes left the team in 2010, the Diamondbacks won the division in 2011 with a lower-third payroll from a roster he had largely constructed. In a 15-year span, Arizona trails only Tampa Bay, Cleveland and Oakland in producing 90-win seasons with a lower-third payroll. In addition, Byrnes oversaw the 2006-2010 drafts for the Diamondbacks, which have produced over 195 WAR (Wins above Replacement) through the conclusion of the 2020 season - a higher total than any other team has produced in those five drafts. Max Scherzer (2006), Paul Goldschmidt (2009), AJ Pollock (2009) and Adam Eaton (2010) are a few of the notable picks from those drafts. In 2009, Byrnes traded Max Scherzer to the Detroit Tigers and later acknowledged his regret in making that trade.
Byrnes reunited with Scherzer in 2021 through a trade with the Washington Nationals to add him to the Los Angeles Dodgers.

San Diego Padres

Byrnes joined the San Diego Padres as senior vice president of baseball operations in 2010. In 2011, he was promoted to general manager.

By spring 2012, it was clear that MLB was not going to approve Jeff Moorad’s purchase of the Padres.  As a result, Byrnes was an inherited GM for a new ownership group led by Ron Fowler. When the Padres did not perform according to Fowler's expectations, he relieved Byrnes of his duties.  However, from 2012-2014, the Padres' average payroll was 26th out of 30 teams. 
 
During Byrnes’ time with the Padres, his drafting excellence continued. In the three drafts he oversaw from 2012-2014, the Padres selected Trea Turner, Max Fried, Hunter Renfroe and Zach Eflin with their first-round picks. Each of the four selections would eventually reach 6 WAR in their careers. Only two other Padres first-rounders in the preceding 17 years would reach that threshold. Additionally, Fried and Turner would receive Cy Young Award and MVP votes, respectively, and represent the NL in the All-Star game. 

In Byrnes' final season in 2014, he assembled a record-setting pitching staff and the Padres set a franchise record with the fewest runs allowed in a 162-game season. Byrnes also engineered a trade with Cincinnati to acquire Yasmani Grandal, Yonder Alonso and Brad Boxberger, who all became All-Stars.

Los Angeles Dodgers
In 2014, Byrnes joined the Los Angeles Dodgers as senior vice president of baseball operations. He was recruited by Andrew Friedman, who had just joined the team as president of baseball operations. With Byrnes at the helm of scouting and the farm system, the Dodgers have placed in the top 10  in each of MLB Pipeline's biannual farm system rankings since they began in 2015. Plus, the team has posted their five best winning percentage seasons as a franchise since moving to Los Angeles in 1958. The Dodgers have advanced to the World Series in 2017, 2018 and 2020 and in 2019, the Dodgers finished the season with the most victories in franchise history (106). The 2020 Dodgers went 43-17 during the COVID-19 shortened regular season and won their first World Series in 32 years. Called "historically great" by CBS Sports, the 2022 Dodgers are on track to be one of the best MLB teams of all time. 

In 2020, MLB Pipeline  ranked the Dodgers farm system as the third best in the game with five prospects listed among MLB Pipeline’s top 100: Gavin Lux, SS/2B (No. 2), Dustin May, RHP (No. 23), Josiah Gray, RHP (No. 67), Keibert Ruiz, C (No. 73) and Brusdar Graterol, RHP (No. 83). Lux, May and catcher Will Smith came from the 2016 Draft, which, according to MLB.com, may go down as the most productive since the Dodgers’ legendary 1968 Draft put 11 players in the Major Leagues.

Five players for the Dodgers have received Rookie of the Year votes during Byrnes’ time with the team. They include Corey Seager, who won the award in 2016, and Cody Bellinger, who won the award in 2017, as well as Walker Buehler, Tony Gonsolin and Dustin May.  
Baseball America called Los Angeles the model franchise in the sport during his tenure as senior vice president.

References

1970 births
Living people
Major League Baseball general managers
Boston Red Sox executives
Cleveland Indians executives
Colorado Rockies executives
Arizona Diamondbacks executives
San Diego Padres executives
Los Angeles Dodgers executives
St. Albans School (Washington, D.C.) alumni
Haverford College alumni